Dissonance is the 12th studio album from the band Enuff Z'Nuff. The album reunites singers/songwriters Donnie Vie and Chip Z'Nuff after Vie's hiatus from the band of several years. Original sessions for the album started in 2006, prompted by the band's possible inclusion in a pilot episode for the VH-1 show "Bands on the Run." Songs from these initial sessions, bootlegged as Lost In Vegas by fans, would be later reworked for the official release of Dissonance. Several songs on the CD feature past Ozzy Osbourne/Badlands guitarist Jake E. Lee.

A limited edition of Dissonance was first sold in the U.S. at the Rocklahoma festival on July 10, 2008, featuring 9 tracks. Dissonance was officially released April 22, 2009 in Japan and on July 19, 2010 in the U.K. The U.K. edition features the bonus tracks "Code Red" and "Run For Your Life."

Initially planned as a DVD release, a 2-CD live album of Enuff Z'Nuff's Japanese tour of Dissonance was created. Titled Live And Peace, it was released in Japan through King Records in December 2009.

On November 27, 2020, a limited edition colored-vinyl release of Dissonance was released on Cleopatra/Deadline Records in the United States. Featuring new cover art, it is also the first time the album has technically been released on a U.S. label.

Track listing

Personnel
Donnie Vie – Vocals, Guitars, Piano
Chip Z'Nuff – Vocals, Bass Guitar
Jake E. Lee - Lead Guitar
Vinnie Castaldo - Drums

Release history

References 

Enuff Z'nuff albums
2009 albums